Canton of Marseille-La Belle-de-Mai is a former canton located within the commune of Marseille in the Bouches-du-Rhône department of France. It was created 27 February 2003 by the decree 2003-156 of that date. It was disbanded following the French canton reorganisation which came into effect in March 2015. Its population was 28,667 in 2012.

Elected to represent the canton in the General Council of Bouches-du-Rhône'' : 
 Lisette Narducci (PS, 2001-2008)

Area
It is composed of the part of the 3rd arrondissement of Marseille south of an imaginary line along boulevard Mirabeau, boulevard National until rue Hoche (which is excluded), rue Jean-Christofol, rue Belle-de-Mai, rue Loubon until rue Barsotti, rue Ricard, rue Bonhomme, rue Joseph-Cabasson, traverse Bon-Secours until the border with the 14th arrondissement.

See also 
 Arrondissement of Marseille
 Cantons of the Bouches-du-Rhône department
 Communes of the Bouches-du-Rhône department

References

Former cantons of Marseille
Marseille-La Belle-de-Mai
2015 disestablishments in France
States and territories disestablished in 2015
2003 establishments in France